Thomas Darcy (22 February 1881 – 29 September 1955) was an Australian rules footballer who played a single game with South Melbourne in the Victorian Football League (VFL) in 1904.

Notes

External links 

1881 births
1955 deaths
Australian rules footballers from Victoria (Australia)
Sydney Swans players